The 2015–16 Georgia State Panthers men's basketball team represented Georgia State University during the 2015–16 NCAA Division I men's basketball season. The team's head coach was Ron Hunter in his fifth season. The Panthers played their home games at the GSU Sports Arena and competed as a member of the Sun Belt Conference. They finished the season 16–14, 9–11 in Sun Belt play to finish in sixth place. They lost in the first round of the Sun Belt tournament to Texas State

Last season
The Panthers finished the season 25–10, 15–5 in SBC play to finish in first place. They also won the SBC tournament and advanced to the round of 32 in the NCAA tournament after upsetting third seed, Baylor.

Departures

Incoming Transfers

Roster

Schedule

|-
!colspan=9 style="background:#003399; color:#FFFFFF;"| Exhibition

|-
!colspan=9 style="background:#003399; color:#FFFFFF;"| Regular season

|-
!colspan=9 style="background:#003399; color:#FFFFFF;"| Conference Games

|-
!colspan=9 style="background:#003399; color:#FFFFFF;"| Sun Belt Tournament

References

Georgia State Panthers men's basketball seasons
Georgia State
2015 in sports in Georgia (U.S. state)
2016 in sports in Georgia (U.S. state)